In organic chemistry, a rearrangement reaction is a broad class of organic reactions where the carbon skeleton of a molecule is rearranged to give a structural isomer of the original molecule. Often a substituent moves from one atom to another atom in the same molecule, hence these reactions are usually intramolecular. In the example below, the substituent R moves from carbon atom 1 to carbon atom 2:
 

Intermolecular rearrangements also take place. 

A rearrangement is not well represented by simple and discrete electron transfers (represented by curved arrows in organic chemistry texts). The actual mechanism of alkyl groups moving, as in Wagner-Meerwein rearrangement, probably involves transfer of the moving alkyl group fluidly along a bond, not ionic bond-breaking and forming. In pericyclic reactions, explanation by orbital interactions give a better picture than simple discrete electron transfers. It is, nevertheless, possible to draw the curved arrows for a sequence of discrete electron transfers that give the same result as a rearrangement reaction, although these are not necessarily realistic. In allylic rearrangement, the reaction is indeed ionic.

Three key rearrangement reactions are 1,2-rearrangements, pericyclic reactions and olefin metathesis.

1,2-rearrangements

A 1,2-rearrangement is an organic reaction where a substituent moves from one atom to another atom in a chemical compound. In a 1,2 shift the movement involves two adjacent atoms but moves over larger distances are possible. Skeletal isomerization is not normally encountered in the laboratory, but is the basis of large applications in oil refineries.  In general, straight-chain alkanes are converted to branched isomers by heating in the presence of a catalyst. Examples include isomerisation of n-butane to isobutane and pentane to isopentane.  Highly branched alkanes have favorable combustion characteristics for internal combustion engines. 
 

Further examples are the Wagner-Meerwein rearrangement:

and the Beckmann rearrangement, which is relevant to the production of certain nylons:

Pericyclic reactions

A pericyclic reaction is a type of reaction with multiple carbon-carbon bond making and breaking wherein the transition state of the molecule has a cyclic geometry, and the reaction progresses in a concerted fashion. Examples are hydride shifts

and the Claisen rearrangement:

Olefin metathesis

Olefin metathesis is a formal exchange of the alkylidene fragments in two alkenes. It is a catalytic reaction with carbene, or more accurately, transition metal carbene complex intermediates.

In this example (ethenolysis, a pair of vinyl compounds form a new symmetrical alkene with expulsion of ethylene.

Other rearragement reactions

1,3-rearrangements 
1,3-rearrangements take place over 3 carbon atoms. Examples:

 the Fries rearrangement
 a 1,3-alkyl shift of verbenone to chrysanthenone

See also
 Beckmann rearrangement
 Curtius rearrangement
 Hofmann rearrangement
 Lossen rearrangement
 Schmidt reaction
 Tiemann rearrangement
 Wolff rearrangement
 Photochemical rearrangements
 Thermal rearrangement of aromatic hydrocarbons
Mumm rearrangement

References